Worst-case circuit analysis (WCCA or WCA) is a cost-effective means of screening a design to ensure with a high degree of confidence that potential defects and deficiencies are identified and eliminated prior to and during test, production, and delivery.

It is a quantitative assessment of the equipment performance, accounting for manufacturing, environmental and aging effects. In addition to a circuit analysis, a WCCA often includes stress and derating analysis, failure modes and effects criticality (FMECA) and reliability prediction (MTBF).

The specific objective is to verify that the design is robust enough to provide operation which meets the system performance specification over design life under worst-case conditions and tolerances (initial, aging, radiation, temperature, etc.).

Stress and de rating analysis is intended to increase reliability by providing sufficient margin compared to the allowable stress limits. This reduces overstress conditions that may induce failure, and reduces the rate of stress-induced parameter change over life. It determines the maximum applied stress to each component in the system.

General information 
A worst-case circuit analysis should be performed on all circuitry that is safety and financially critical. Worst-case circuit analysis is an analysis technique which, by accounting for component variability, determines the circuit performance under a worst-case scenario (under extreme environmental or operating conditions). Environmental conditions are defined as external stresses applied to each circuit component. It includes temperature, humidity or radiation. Operating conditions include external electrical inputs, component quality level, interaction between parts, and drift due to component aging.

WCCA helps in the process of building design reliability into hardware for long-term field operation. Electronic piece-parts fail in two distinct modes:
 
Out-of-tolerance limits: Through this, the circuit continues to operate, though with degraded performance, and ultimately exceeds the circuit's required operating limits.

Catastrophic failures may be minimized through MTBF, stress and derating, and FMECA analyses that help to ensure that all components are properly derated, as well as that degradation is occurring “gracefully...”

A WCCA permits you to predict and judge the circuit performance limits beneath all of the combos of half tolerances.

There are many reasons to perform WCCA. Here are a few that may be impactful to schedule and cost.

Methodology 

Worst-case analysis is the analysis of a device (or system) that assures that the device meets its performance specifications. These are typically accounting for tolerances that are due to initial component tolerance, temperature tolerance, age tolerance and environmental exposures (such as radiation for a space device). The beginning of life analysis comprises the initial tolerance and provides the data sheet limits for the manufacturing test cycle. The end of life analysis provides the additional degradation resulting from the aging and temperature effects on the elements within the device or system.

This analysis is usually performed using SPICE, but mathematical models of individual circuits within the device (or system) are needed to determine the sensitivities or the worst-case performance. A computer program is frequently used to total and summarize the results.

A WCCA follows these steps:
 Generate/obtain circuit model 
 Obtain correlation to validate model 
 Determine sensitivity to each component parameter 
 Determine component tolerances 
 Calculate the variance of each component parameter as sensitivity times absolute tolerance 
 Use at least two methods of analysis (e.g. hand analysis and SPICE or Saber, SPICE and measured data) to assure the result 
 Generate a formal report to convey the information produced

The design is broken down into the appropriate functional sections. A mathematical model of the circuit is developed and the effects of various part/system tolerances are applied. The circuit's EVA and RSS results are determined for beginning-of-life and end-of-life states.

These results are used to calculate part stresses and are applied to other analysis. In order for the WCCA to be useful throughout the product’s life cycle, it is extremely important that the analysis be documented in a clear and concise format. This will allow for future updates and review by other than the original designer. A compliance matrix is generated that clearly identifies the results and all issues.

External links
 WCCA Simple Comparing of different Methods :DOI: 10.13140/RG.2.2.13287.75689
 Mil-Std 785B has a short section on WCCA
 Why Perform a Worse Case Analysis
 Aerospace Corporation - Aerospace Corp. Mission Assurance Improvement Workshop: Electrical Design Worst-Case Circuit Analysis: Guidelines and Draft Standard (REV A) (MAIW), TOR-2013-00297
 European Cooperation for Space Standardization, See Worst case circuit performance analysis - ECSS-Q-30-01A and ECSS-Q-HB-30-01A and Dependability ECSS-Q-ST-30C

Reliability analysis